Ranwell is a surname. Notable people with the name include:

 Laura Ranwell (born 1941), South African swimmer
 William Ranwell (1797–1861), English landscape artist